A list of tourist attractions in the English county of Kent.

Castles, houses and historical buildings

Canterbury Cathedral 
Chartwell (principal adult home of Winston Churchill) 
Chiddingstone Castle  
Deal Castle  
Dover Castle  
The Grange, Ramsgate 
Hever Castle 
Ightham Mote 14th century house 
Knole House 
Leeds Castle 
Penshurst Place 
Fort Amherst, Chatham 
Reculver (Roman fort & Reculver Towers) 
Richborough Castle & Roman Fort 
Rochester Castle  
Rochester Cathedral 
St Augustine's Abbey 
Scotney Castle 
Sissinghurst Castle Garden 
Smallhythe Place 
Squerryes Court 
Tonbridge Castle 
Upnor Castle  
Walmer Castle

Country parks, gardens and accessible open spaces

Ashford Green Corridor 
Bedgebury National Pinetum 
Bewl Water 
Bough Beech Reservoir
Brockhill Country Park 
Capstone Farm Country Park 
Emmetts Garden 
Hoo Peninsula
Milton Creek Country Park 
North Downs Way  a long distance footpath
Pines Garden
Stour Valley Walk 
Isle of Thanet
The Hop Farm Country Park 
The Wantsum Channel
White Cliffs of Dover

Museums
Ashford Borough Museum 
Chatham Historic Dockyard 
Dolphin Yard Sailing Barge Museum 
Dover Museum 
Kent Battle of Britain Museum 
Kent International Airport (formerly known as London Manston Airport) with two aviation museums 
Kent Museum of Freemasonry 
Maidstone Museum & Bentlif Art Gallery 
Ramsgate Maritime Museum 
Royal Engineers Museum 
Willesborough Windmill

Ancient monuments
Coldrum Stones near Trottiscliffe
Julliberrie's Grave near Chilham
Kit's Coty House near Aylesford
Lower Mill, Woodchurch
Medway megaliths (various locations in the Medway valley)

Railways
Bredgar and Wormshill Light Railway 
East Kent Railway 
Kent & East Sussex Railway 
Romney, Hythe & Dymchurch Railway 
Sittingbourne & Kemsley Light Railway 
Spa Valley Railway

Wildlife Parks, Zoos & Farm Attractions
Howletts Wild Animal Park 
Wildwood Trust (previously Wildwood Discovery Park)
Port Lympne Zoo  
Rare Species Conservation Centre
Wingham Wildlife Park (previously Wingham Bird Park)

Others
Bluewater Shopping Centre
Chatham Dockyard
Cinque Ports
Dickens World 
Diggerland 
Dreamland Margate 
Ebbsfleet United F.C.
Gillingham Football Club
Margate Football Club
Romney Marsh
St. Lawrence Cricket Ground, Canterbury
Shell Grotto, Margate
Turner Contemporary

 
Tourist attractions
Kent